Trinity Beach is a coastal suburb of Cairns in the Cairns Region, Queensland, Australia.

Geography 

Trinity Beach is also a beach stretching for about a mile on the eastern coast of Australia bounded by the Coral Sea. The suburb itself is approximately 2 km wide.

History 
Trinity Beach is situated in the Djabugay (Tjapukai) traditional Aboriginal country. 

The origin of the suburb name is derived from Trinity Bay.

Trinity Beach State School opened on 30 January 1979.

Education 
Trinity Beach State School is a government primary (P-6) school for boys and girls in Wewak Street. In 2016, the school had an enrolment of 923 students with 60 teaching staff (57 full-time equivalent) and 36 non-teaching staff (22 full-time equivalent).

References

External links

 University of Queensland: Queensland Places: Trinity Beach

Suburbs of Cairns
Beaches of Queensland